Security Administration may refer to:
 Transportation Security Administration
 State Security Administration, intelligence agency of SFR Yugoslavia
 Security Administration (FR Yugoslavia), military intelligence agency of FR Yugoslavia